The River Tean is a small river whose course is entirely within the English county of Staffordshire.

Description 
This short river is a tributary of the River Dove; it is just  from its source at Dilhorne to its confluence with the Dove east of Uttoxeter. The river flows generally in a southeasterly direction.

References 

Rivers of Staffordshire
1Tean